Eladio de Mora-Granados (born 1960), known artistically as dEmo, is a Spanish artist. He is known for his large and colourful sculptures that resemble toys.

Biography
dEmo was born in Mora in the Province of Toledo. A property developer by profession, he is active in creating and collecting art. In nine years from starting his collection in 1995, he had acquired 400 works of art. The most expensive was a sculpture by Fernando Botero for 36 million Spanish pesetas (over €200,000).

Often using plastic, polyester or resin, dEmo's works are brightly coloured and show repetition, such as his sculptures of gummy bears which have been installed at various locations. In 2007, 40 of these two-metre sculptures were placed on a new main boulevard in Logroño, La Rioja, with two 75-centimetre copies to be placed on the city hall.

In 2016, he was chosen to design the trophies for the Miami Fashion Week film awards. The trophies take the design of a Tequesta native. He has also designed trophies for COCEF, the Official Chamber of Commerce of Spain in France, taking the form of a rooster.

dEmo lives in Getafe, Community of Madrid, and has exhibited his sculptures from the city hall. One of his trademark bears, in blue and with wings, became the mascot of football team Getafe CF in 2012.

Selected works
Nensi, a Loch Ness monster and her baby in a fountain at the roundabout on the entrance to Leganés in the Community of Madrid (2009).
Rana de la fortuna ("Lucky Frog"), bronze sculpture outside the Casino Gran Madrid (2014).

References

External links

1960 births
Living people
People from the Province of Toledo
People from Getafe
Artists from Castilla–La Mancha
Artists from the Community of Madrid
Spanish art collectors
Spanish sculptors